Cottbus-Willmersdorf Nord station is a railway station in the Willmersdorf district in the town of Cottbus, located in Brandenburg, Germany.

References

External links

Railway stations in Brandenburg
Buildings and structures in Cottbus